Football Club Calcio Acri or simply Acri is an Italian association football club, based in Acri, Calabria. Acri currently plays in Eccellenza Calabria.

History 

The first traces of the football in Acri goes back to 1926. The September 23, 1949 is the date of foundation. the same year of foundation coincides with the conquest of first title, the group a of the first division, after winning the play-off against Silana for 2–1.
From 1974 to 1985 the S.S. Acri participated in the highest Calabrian championship, the Promozione.A result to remember is the play-out of 28 May 1978, on the neutral ground of Lamezia Terme, finished 4-3 after extra-time (regular time 2-2) against Palmese.
In 1984-1985 Acri got the first promotion in the Interregional Championship, category where it remained for eight years losing the Serie C2 in Interregional Championship 1986–1987, when it arrived to the second place at one point behind the leader Kroton.

After the relegation occurred in 1993, the S.S. Acri was replaced by S.S. New Acri in the following years. New Acri won the Promozione championship (1998-1999) and Eccellenza championship (1999-2000) and a Calabria Supercup (1999-2000), and participated for two years at Series D from 2000 to 2002.

With the failure of the S.S. New Acri, the football reborn in 2004 when F.C. Football Acri was refounded . In 2010-2011 Acri won Eccellenza championship and the second Calabria Supercup, and it was promoted in Serie D. In Serie D championship 2011–2012, after a first half of championship played at the top, the team collapsed in the second half of championship ending the season at 13th place and it was relegated to Eccellenza after losing the play-out against Nissa. In the same year the national television (RAI) transmitted the championship match Acri-Marsala on channel Rai Sport 1.

In the season 2014-2015 the F.C. Football Acri won the Calabria Cup beating Cittanovese for 1 to 0 in the final played in Lamezia Terme on January 4, 2015. In the national phase of the competition Acri won the second round beating Marsala,but in the quarter of finals the Rossoneri were eliminated by Virtus Francavilla.

Chronological History

Staff Members 
Staff Members updated 12-4-2017.

Colors and badge 
The team's color are black and red. The team's symbol is a wolf.

Stadium 
Acri plays its home matches at Stadio Pasquale Castrovillari, a small stadium located north of the city in natural grass.

The stadium is divided into three sectors: the grandstand, or tribuna centrale, with a capacity of 2,200, where the home and organized supporters sit down; the visitors grandstand, situated in front of the tribuna centrale, with a capacity of 1,000; and the curva (although it is not really a curved sector), usually closed.

South down the stadium, there is also a ground training field.

Notable players 
  Giuseppe Pancaro Interregionale player in the 1990s and 2000s for Cagliari, Lazio, Milan, ACF Fiorentina, Torino F.C. and Italia.
  Dragutin Ristić Interregionale player in the 1980s and 1990s for Partizan, Dundee , Falkirk, Dundee United.

Titles

Regional Championships 
 Eccellenza:2
1999-2000
2010-2011

Promozione:1
1984-85

 Prima Divisione:1
1949-1950

Cups 
Coppa Italia Dilettanti Calabria: 1
2014-2015

Supercoppa Calabria: 2
1999-2000
2010-2011

Statistics

Presences in championships 
National Championships

Regional Championships

Team Statistics 
Team final position in the championships:

Legenda:
      Serie D.       Maximum Regional Level.       Second Maximum Regional Level.

Timeline

Fans

History
The first Organized groups are the "Commandos Club Acri," born in 1973 and "Erotik Club ", also founded in the seventies. In 1985 Rossonere Brigades were founded. Now ultras groups are The" GRUA "born in nineties and '" Alkool Group ".

Friendship and rivalry 
The Acri fans have good relationships with Corigliano, Trebisacce, Sambiase, Locri, Licata, Cosenza, Caserta, Genoa and Marsala. More rivalries instead on with Castrovillari, Palmese,  Paolana,  Rossanese, Vigor Lamezia.

References

External links 
Official Club Website 

Football clubs in Calabria
Association football clubs established in 2004
2004 establishments in Italy
1949 establishments in Italy
Association football clubs established in 1949